The 2011–12 Maltese Premier League was the 97th season of the Maltese Premier League, the top-tier football league in Malta. It began on 19 August 2011 and it ended in May 2012. Valletta were the defending champions, having won their 20th title last season.

The Premier League consists of two rounds. In the First Round, every team plays each opponent twice, once "home" and once "away" (in actuality, the designation of home and away is purely arbitrary as most of the clubs do not have their own grounds), for a total of 22 games. The league then splits into two pools. Earned points are subsequently halved. Teams that finish in positions 1–6 compete in the "Top Six" and teams that finish in positions 7–12 play in the "Play-Out".

On 13 January 2011, the Malta Football Association decided to expand the league to 12 teams starting with this season.

Teams
Vittoriosa Stars were relegated to the First Division after finishing in last place of the Play-Out last season. This ended a one-year stay in the Premier League for them. Taking their place in the competition are Balzan, the champions of the Maltese First Division. Balzan are playing in the Premier League after a seven season absence.

Because of the league's expansion for this season, the second- and third-place finishers of the First Division, Mqabba and Mosta respectively, were also promoted to the Premier League for this season. Mqabba return to the top league after a three year absence while Mosta return after five years away.

Venues

Stadia and training grounds
Only a few stadia have the infrastructure needed to host Premier League matches. These are Ta' Qali National Stadium and Centenary Stadium at Ta' Qali, Attard, Victor Tedesco Stadium at Ħamrun and Hibernians Ground at Paola. Additional to that, each team has been assigned to a dedicated training ground. On a few occasions, Hibernians and Hamrun Spartans play at their home ground, but otherwise all games are played on neutral ground, rendering "home" and "away" games purely symbolic.

First phase

League table

Results

Second phase

Top Six

Play-Out

Top goalscorers

References

External links
 Premier League official page
 UEFA website

Maltese Premier League seasons
Malta
1